Smilesaurus is an extinct genus of gorgonopsian known from Africa. It lived during the Late Permian. It contains the single species S. ferox.

Description
Smilesaurus was a large gorgonopsian, with a skull length of up to 31 centimeters. It is characterized by extremely long canine teeth, and has the proportionally longest canines of any gorgonopsian. Unlike other gorgonopsians, which probably hunted similarly to predatory reptiles, Smilesaurus probably was a true saber-toothed predator which hunted using similar tactics to saber-toothed cats. It can be distinguished by other rubidgeines by its lack of cranial pachyostosis and rugosoties, and by its relatively small orbits.

Classification
The classification of Smilesaurus has been disputed. It has often been included in Rubidgeinae, but it differs from other members of the clade considerably. Instead, it may be more closely related to Arctops, a position supported by a phylogenetic analysis in 2018.

Below is a cladogram of Gorgonopsia from Bendel et al. 2018:

See also

 List of therapsids

References

 The main groups of non-mammalian synapsids at Mikko's Phylogeny Archive

Gorgonopsia
Prehistoric therapsid genera
Fossil taxa described in 1948
Taxa named by Robert Broom